High Road – Central College is a tram stop on the Nottingham Express Transit (NET) network, in the district of Broxtowe, East Midlands, United Kingdom. The stop lies immediately to the Beeston side of the boundary between the suburbs of Chilwell and Beeston. The original proposed name for the stop was Castle College, and some publications still use that name.

The stop is situated on reserved track alongside High Road and in front of the Beeston centre of Nottingham College, and has side platforms flanking the track. Trams run at frequencies that vary between 4 and 8 trams per hour, depending on the day and time of day.

High Road – Central College stop opened on 25 August 2015, along with the rest of NET's phase two.

References

External links

Nottingham Express Transit stops
Transport in the Borough of Broxtowe

Alstom Citadis 302 NET (Nottingham Express Transit) 217 Carl Froch at High Road - Central College on a tram service to Hucknall. (Green line)